The Guyana national basketball team represents Guyana in international competitions. It is governed by the Guyana Amateur Basketball Federation (GABF).

Its main accomplishment was the silver medal at the 1994 Caribbean Basketball Championship.

In 2019, Guyana's top player Delroy James wanted to join the national team. Yet, he did not get his passport extended in time.

Roster
2019 Squad at FIBA AmeriCup 2021 Pre-Qualifiers:

Depth chart

Competitions

Performance at CaribeBasket

Past rosters
Team for the 2015 FIBA CBC Championship.

The side that represented Guyana at the CBC Sr. Championship 2007 was composed of:

Head coach position
 Robert Cadogan – 2011
 Mark Agard – 2014
 Darcell Harris – 2015
 Junior Hercules – 2018-present

Kit

Manufacturer
2019: Nike

See also
 Basketball in Guyana
 Guyana women's national basketball team

References

External links
 Latinbasket.com - Guyana Men National Team 
 GuyanaBasketball.com
 Presentation at CaribbeanBasketball.com
 Archived records of Guyana team participations

Videos
 Guyana v Surinam - FIBA AmeriCup 2021 - CBC Prequalifiers Youtube.com video

Men's national basketball teams
Basketball in Guyana
Basketball teams in Guyana
Basketball
1961 establishments in British Guiana